Runki Goswami is an Indian classical singer and composer who sings in 17 different Indian languages, also a Telugu music director.

Early life and career
Runki Goswami was born in Asansol, West Bengal, on 12 June 1978. Her formal training started at the age of 3. She is trained in the Dilli and Chandigarh Gharana from Prayag Sangeet Samiti. She did her executive management from ISB Hyderabad and a Masters in Communication and Journalism.

Runki Goswami started her professional music career with a private Bengali Devotional album – Debobeena. The lyrics were written by her father, Dr. Malay Kumar Laik which she composed, directed and sung. The album was released Pan India by Keerthana music. Following this, she was the music director for two Telugu films, writer, Thedavaste fighter and Trivikraman.

She is also a pioneer and huge proponent of reviving Indian Ragas as an alternative therapy. She is currently working on projects with medical practitioners to create an awareness of Indian Raga therapy to help heal patients faster from chronic diseases like asthma, spine issues, stomach problems etc. Her articles on Raga Therapy have generated a lot of curiosity about this traditional Indian Raga therapy which was otherwise getting lost to other influences.

In 2018, Runki performed at Indian High Commission in London and represents India. She had sung in 17 languages.

Soundtracks

Non films
The following songs were sung by Runki Goswami.

Debobeena
Manmarziyan
Esho Devi
Teen Maar Beatulakki
Ni andelasandarilo 
Teen maar beatulakki 
kabhie ajnabi thi
Ab naahi chanda
Loomba Jhoomba
Luk Chhip
Kesariya Baalam
Rangi Saari
Saiya mile
Bhedu Paako
Morni

Films
Thedavaste Fighter (Writer)
Trivikraman

Cultural performances

National
Ghazal Evening, Ode to Farida Khanum: Lamakaan – Hyderabad, 2016
Tribute to Geeta Dutt – India Habitat Centre, 2016
Tribute to Farida Khanum – Epicentre, Gurgaon, Haryana, 2016
Heirloom Collection of Indian Folk – India International Centre, 2017
Tribute to Salil Choudhary, India Habitat Centre, 2017
Tribute to O.P. Nayyar, India Habitat Centre, 2018
Raga to depict moods and Seasons in Bollywood – India Habitat Centre, 2019

International
Folk Tour of India – Heirloom Collection of Indian Folk – Nehru Centre, London – 2018

References 

21st-century Indian women classical singers
Indian classical composers
People from Asansol
Living people
1978 births
Bengali Hindus
21st-century Bengalis
Indian women classical singers
21st-century Indian classical singers
Musicians from West Bengal
20th-century Indian composers
Indian women composers
Indian composers
Ghazal singers
Indian ghazal singers
Bhajan singers
Indian women folk singers
Thumri
Bengali musicians
Bengali singers
Bengali women artists